is a railway station operated by Kobe New Transit in Chūō-ku, Kobe, Japan. It is located on Port Island and is served by the Port Island Line. The station name is derived from its location next to the Kobe City Medical Center General Hospital.

Prior to 1 July 2011, the station was named .

Ridership

Gallery

Adjacent stations

References

External links
  

Railway stations in Japan opened in 2006
Railway stations in Kobe